Ona Šimaitė (6 January 1894 – 17 January 1970) was a Lithuanian librarian at Vilnius University who used her position to aid and rescue Jews in the Vilna Ghetto during World War II. She is recognized as a Righteous Among the Nations.

Life

Born in Akmenė, Lithuania on 6 January 1894 and later educated in Moscow, Šimaitė became a librarian at Vilnius University in 1940. In 1941, the Nazis invaded Lithuania and created the Vilna Ghetto. She began entering the ghetto under the pretext of recovering library books from Jewish university students. Over the next three years, she smuggled small arms (helped by Kazys Boruta, amongst others) as well as food and other provisions; smuggled out literary and historical documents for the Paper Brigade; and also served as a mail carrier for ghetto inhabitants, connecting them with the outside world. She also found people who would forge documents for Jews, offered her home as a temporary refuge for Jews, and smuggled Jewish children out of the ghetto to families that she found who agreed to hide them.

In April 1944, the Gestapo arrested Šimaitė and tortured her. A ransom paid by the rector of the university spared her from immediate execution, and she was deported to Dachau concentration camp in Germany, then later transferred to an internment camp at Ludelange in France. After the camp was liberated by the Allies, Šimaitė remained in France, working as a librarian, except for a period from 1953 to 1956 spent in Israel.

On 15 March 1966, the Israeli organisation Yad Vashem recognized Šimaitė as a Righteous Among the Nations, planting a tree in her honour. Šimaitė died outside of Paris on 17 January 1970 and, per her request, her body was donated to science. In 2015, Lithuania's first street named in honor of a Righteous Among the Nations was unveiled in Vilnius; the street is named Šimaitės Street, after Šimaitė.

Notes
This article incorporates text from the United States Holocaust Memorial Museum, and has been released under the GFDL.

References

External links
Epistolophilia: Writing the Life of Ona Simaite, by Julija Sukys
Ona Šimaitė papers at the Hoover Institution Archives
United States Holocaust Memorial Museum - Ona Simaite, Joop Westerweel, Irena Sendlerowa

1894 births
1970 deaths
Academic librarians
Lithuanian emigrants to France
Lithuanian librarians
Women librarians
Lithuanian Righteous Among the Nations
Dachau concentration camp survivors
Vilna Ghetto
Lithuanian people of World War II
Female anti-fascists